A national poet or national bard is a poet held by tradition and popular acclaim to represent the identity, beliefs and principles of a particular national culture. The national poet as culture hero is a long-standing symbol, to be distinguished from successive holders of a bureaucratically-appointed poet-laureate office. The idea and honoring of national poets emerged primarily during Romanticism, as a figure that helped consolidation of the nation states, as it provided validation of their ethno-linguistic groups.

Most national poets are historic figures, though a few contemporary writers working in relatively new or revived national literatures are also considered "national poets." Though not formally elected, national poets play a role in shaping a country's understanding of itself. Some nations may have more than one national poet; the idea of a single one is always a simplification. It has been argued that a national poet "must write poetry that closely identifies with the nation's cause – or is thought to do so", with an additional assumption being that "a national poet must write in a national language".

The following is a list of nations, with their associated national poets. It is not a list of sovereign states or countries, though many of the nations listed may also be such. The terms "nation" (as cultural concept), "country" (as geographical concept) and "state" (as political concept) are not synonyms.

Africa

Asia

Europe

North America

Oceania

South America

References

Further reading
 Marcel Cornis-Pope and John Neubauer, eds., Figures of National Poets (2004)
 Edward Whitley, American Bards: Walt Whitman and Other Unlikely Candidates for National Poet (2010)
 Michael Dobson, The Making of the National Poet (1992)
 Josep R. Llobera, Foundations of National Identity (2004)

National poets
Poet
Poets